Tatria octacantha is a species of tapeworm in the family Amabiliidae.

References

Cestoda
Animal parasites of vertebrates
Animals described in 1974